The 2015 Piala Sumbangsih was the 30th edition of the Piala Sumbangsih, an annual football match played between the winners of the previous season's Malaysia Super League and Malaysia Cup. The game was played between Pahang, winners of the 2014 Malaysia Cup, and Johor Darul Ta'zim, champions of the 2014 Malaysia Super League. Watched by a crowd of 25,000 at Tan Sri Dato Haji Hassan Yunos Stadium, Johor Darul Ta'zim won the match 2–0.

Match Details

Winners

References

Piala Sumbangsih seasons
2015 in Malaysian football